Xanthoma striatum palmare is a cutaneous condition characterized by xanthomas of the palmar creases which are almost diagnostic for dysbetalipoproteinemia.

Xanthomas consist of accumulations of lipids within macrophages deposited within the dermis of the skin.

See also 
 Xanthoma tendinosum
 List of cutaneous conditions
 List of xanthoma variants associated with hyperlipoproteinemia subtypes

References 

Skin conditions resulting from errors in metabolism